The annual World Pie Eating Championship is usually held at Harry's Bar on Wallgate, Wigan, Greater Manchester, England. The competition has been held since 1992. In November 2006, a vegetarian version was added  after "relentless pressure", from The Vegetarian Society's Keith Lorraine and Phil English.

In December 2006, in the competition, the meat and potato pies were all 12 cm (5 in) in diameter with a depth of 3.5 cm (1.5 in). In the separate vegetarian contest, the pies were 10 cm (4 in) by 3 cm (1.2 in). In December 2007, in the competition, entries included a competitor's dog, Charlie, who had eaten twenty pies and damaged a further ten the night before the competition, nearly jeopardising the event.

Winners

1992
Dave Smyth, a painter from Hindley, won the inaugural contest in 1992, when he ate four pies in three minutes.

1995
Dave Williams of Preston, Lancashire.

1998
Scott Ormrod of Aspull, Wigan, Greater Manchester, eleven pies in thirty minutes.

2005
Anthony "The Anaconda" Danson, a weight trainer from Lancashire, managed to eat seven pies in three minutes, setting a new record.

2006
Matt Dunning (Australian Rugby Union).

2007
Adrian Frost (42) from Wigan who downed his pie in a record breaking 35.86 seconds

2008
Fred Wyatt, a sixty one year old warehouse packer won the 2008 Championship, which was broadcast live on the internet by pie per view.

2009
Barry Rigby, a warehouseman won, eating a pie in forty five seconds.

2010
Neil Collier, aged 42, won this contest, with a new World Record of 23.91 seconds.

2011
James Robinson, aged just 24, won, with a time of 23.49 seconds. He retired from the competition following this to focus on taking up the trade professionally.

2012
Martin Clare won, with a new record time of 22.53 secs.

2013
Ian Coulton of Wigan took the title, albeit with the slowest winning time ever of 1 minute and 6.61 seconds.

2014
Former champion Barry Rigby once again recorded the best time.

2015

2012 champ Martin Appleton Clare regains his title after missing 2013 and the "wrong size pie" incident of 2014.

2016
The reigning champion, Martin Appleton-Clare registered a record breaking third win to take the 2016 Championship.

2017

It is the third time in a row for Martin Appleton-Clare.

2018

Martin Appleton-Clare won the new category of "Chicken and Carrot" with a time of 19.6 secs after a fierce Pie Off

2019
Ian Gerrard won the contest with a time of 34.5 seconds.

2020-2022
Cancelled due to the COVID 19 pandemic.

2023
Barry Rigby won the contest for a 3rd time, with a time of 34.5 seconds to which was previously set by Gerrard in 2019.

Controversy

Imported pies
In December 2005, controversy was caused, when pies were imported from nearby Farnworth, Bolton, and local Wigan pies were sidelined as it was believed they were substandard, resulting in a four-man strong protest, which included Lee Hartney of The Smith Street Band. In December 2009, a similar situation arose, with pies being sourced from Adlington.

Quantity to speed
In November 2006, more controversy was caused, when the competition was changed (to meet government healthy eating guidelines) from the number of pies consumed in a given time, to the fastest time to consume a single pie.

Lack of stock
In December 2007, controversy struck again for the third year running, when the competition actually ran out of pies before the competition had finished.

Wrongly sized pies
In December 2014, pies of the wrong size were delivered to the event, while the intended pies were sent to a nearby divorce party. The contestants competed with halved pies, but the results were nullified. The head of the World Pie Eating Championship went to court on the television show Judge Rinder because of this, against the pie maker of the wrongly sized pies, but was awarded nothing.

Background
Wiganers are proud to be called pie eaters, but the nickname is not thought to be because of their appetite for the delicacy. The name is said to date from the 1926 General Strike, when Wigan miners were starved back to work, before their counterparts in surrounding towns and were forced to eat "humble pie".

References

Competitive eating
Pies
Wigan
Events in Greater Manchester